Skoumal is a Czech surname. Notable people with the surname include:

 Petr Skoumal (1938–2014), Czech musician and composer
 Stefan Skoumal (1909–1983), Austrian football midfielder
 Václav Skoumal (born 1944), Czech gymnast
 Ana Skoumal (born 1990), Intellectual Property Attorney

Czech-language surnames
Surnames of Czech origin